The 2012 Leinster Senior Football Championship Final was the final game of the 2012 Leinster Senior Football Championship which saw Dublin claim their seventh title in eight years against rivals Meath.

References

Leinster Senior Football Championship Final
Leinster Senior Football Championship Finals
Dublin county football team matches
Meath county football team matches